Samuel James Aiston (born 21 November 1976) is an English former professional footballer.

He played as a midfielder and made over 200 appearances in the Premier League and the Football League, particularly for Sunderland, Chester City, Shrewsbury Town, Tranmere Rovers, Northampton Town and Wrexham. He finished his career in Non-League football and turned out for Stafford Rangers, Hednesford Town and Gainsborough Trinity.

Career
Aiston began his career at Newcastle United in 1994 but made no appearances for the club before joining Sunderland in 1995, where he made over 20 first-team appearances, most as substitute. He was loaned to Chester City, Stoke City and Shrewsbury Town, before joining Shrewsbury for a £50,000 transfer fee in the summer of 2000. Aiston made 165 league appearances for Shrewsbury, scoring seven goals, helping the club to promotion from the Football Conference at the end of the 2003–04 season. Whilst at Shrewsbury Town Aiston endeared himself to the Shrewsbury faithful owing to his style of play.

He was released by Shrewsbury at the end of the 2004–05 season and initially agreed a two-year deal with Grimsby Town, with the official website initially announcing the signing. He then did a u-turn and joined Tranmere Rovers in July 2005, where he made over 40 league and cup appearances in the 2005–06 season. He was released by Tranmere at the end of the season, and joined Northampton Town. Injuries meant he struggled to command a regular first team place and he dropped into the Conference National for a loan spell with Burton Albion.

In November 2007, Aiston joined Wrexham on loan, having previously played for Wrexham manager Brian Little at Tranmere Rovers. Aiston made his debut in a 2–2 draw with Chester City three days later. In January 2008, Aiston's move to Wrexham was made into a permanent signing. He was transfer listed by Wrexham in May 2008 following the club's relegation to the Football Conference.

Aiston went on to play for Stafford Rangers and Hednesford Town before joining Gainsborough Trinity in February 2010. He was released in May 2011.

Personal life
After retiring from playing football Aiston became a primary school teacher, working initially at Bicton primary school near Shrewsbury. 

He got married in August 2012 to Hollie Adams at St Chad's Church, Shrewsbury. At the time he was teacher at Newdale Primary School in Telford, Shropshire. 

In December 2021 Aiston, along with his ex Shrewsbury Town teammates Dave Edwards and Gavin Cowan, launched the podcast, In The Stiffs. 

In November 2022, he was head teacher at Broseley C.ofE. Primary School, when he was named to take up his next appointment as first head teacher at Bowbrook Primary School, Shrewsbury, in 2023.

Career statistics
Source:

A.  The "Other" column constitutes appearances and goals in the Football League Trophy and Football League play-offs.

References

External links
 

1976 births
Living people
English footballers
Newcastle United F.C. players
Sunderland A.F.C. players
Chester City F.C. players
Stoke City F.C. players
Shrewsbury Town F.C. players
Tranmere Rovers F.C. players
Northampton Town F.C. players
Burton Albion F.C. players
Wrexham A.F.C. players
Stafford Rangers F.C. players
Hednesford Town F.C. players
Gainsborough Trinity F.C. players
Premier League players
English Football League players
National League (English football) players
Schoolteachers from Tyne and Wear
Association football midfielders